Bart Kaufman Field is a baseball field in Bloomington, Indiana. It is home of the Indiana Hoosiers baseball team. The capacity of the facility is 2,500 spectators. It is named after Bart Kaufman, an alumnus who played in 1960-61-62. In 1961 he was the second-leading hitter (.452) in the Big Ten to longtime Detroit Tigers player Bill Freehan of the University of Michigan. Kaufman pledged $2.5 million to get the project going. Many teammates contributed to name the Indiana dugout after longtime baseball coach Ernie Andres. Much of the cost, reported to be in excess of $19 million including Andy Mohr Field for softball, was funded by proceeds from the Big Ten Network.

The stadium hosted an NCAA Regional in its first two years of existence; it marked the first two times the IU baseball program has played tournament games on campus. Bart Kaufman Field hosted its first Big Ten baseball tournament from May 24 to 28, 2017.

History

On August 19, 2011, the Indiana University Board of Trustees approved plans for a new baseball–softball complex. These new fields would be located just north of Assembly Hall, near the intersection of the 45/46 bypass and Fee Lane. The new baseball field would replace Sembower Field, which had been the Hoosiers' home field since 1951. On February 15, 2012, Indiana University announced that the new baseball field would be named after Bart Kaufman, CEO of the Indianapolis-based Kaufman Financial Corporation, and an Indiana baseball alumnus. This announcement came after Kaufman pledged $2.5 million to the construction of a new stadium.

Construction began on Bart Kaufman Field in May 2012, and was finished in March 2013; the stadium was formally dedicated on April 26 of that year. The Hoosiers' first game in the stadium was March 20, 2013, with a 15–1 win over Miami University.

On December 19, 2017, Indiana University Athletics announced plans to install an LED video scoreboard, beyond the outfield wall. The size of the new scoreboard is estimated to be 26.8 feet (8.16 m) high by 48.7 (14.84 m) feet wide. Installation of the new scoreboard was completed prior to the start of the 2018 season, with it being utilized for the Hoosiers' home opener on March 6, 2018, against Cincinnati.

Features
The facility has a clubhouse and locker room, training area and team rooms, indoor and outdoor hitting cages, turf field, press box, lights for night play, bench and stadium chair seating, entry plaza, picnic area, concessions and restrooms.

Attendance

Pictures

See also
 List of NCAA Division I baseball venues

References

External links
 Bart Kaufman Field - Indiana Hoosiers

Baseball venues in Indiana
College baseball venues in the United States
Indiana Hoosiers baseball